Elachista slivenica is a moth of the family Elachistidae. It is found in Bulgaria.

The length of the forewings is 4–4.3 mm. The forewing costa is narrowly dark grey basally and broadly bordered by orange. The ground colour consists of pale ochreous, slightly darker tipped scales and the fringe scales are ochreous. The hindwings are grey.

References

slivenica
Endemic fauna of Bulgaria
Moths of Europe
Moths described in 2007